Phirki is an Indian Bengali television soap opera that premiered on 3 February 2020 on Bengali General entertainment Channel Zee Bangla and was also available on the digital platform Zee5. The show stars Aarja Banerjee, Sampriti Poddar and Shayan Mukherjee. The show is produced by Acropoliis Entertainment. The show went off air on 2 January 2021.

Summary
Phirki, a little girl was rescued by Lakshmi, and brought up by her. The story revolves around the lives of Lakshmi and Phirki who happen to share a mother-daughter bond.

Plot
The story, begins with Lakshmi, rescuing a newborn baby girl from angry villagers who threatens to kill her. The girl was left at a boat by a village woman named Sudipa, who was her mother. Lakshmi rescues her and adopts her and names her Phirki. Although she faces difficulties, yet she is able to fulfil her needs and raise her. One day, Phirki meets with a boy named Niladri, and he instantly befriends her. Niladri was the son of Bhaskar Sinha Roy, an influential politician. He takes Phirki to his home and introduces her as his friend. Niladri's mother Nandini instantly bonds with Phirki, since her first child was a transgender. Also his sister Madhuja befriends Phirki. The only ones who hated Phirki are Niladri's grandmother Sunanda, Niladri's aunt Ronjini, Niladri's maternal aunt Roma and Niladri's uncle Rudro, who is also a drug dealer.

Niladri and Phirki develops a strong friendship with each other, which makes her girlfriend Aliya jealous of her. One day, at Ronjini's baby shower ceremony, Aliya's step-mother  Sudipa meets Phirki, unknown that she is her daughter. Sudipa is the wife of industrialist Moloy Roy, Aliya's father, who was also a close friend of Bhaskar. After few days, Niladri was sent by his father to study abroad, but he promised Phirki to return, after he grew up.

12 years later
Phirki becomes a successful lawyer under the guidance of her mother Lokkhi, while Niladri returns to India and meets Phirki. Also, Sunanda and Roma plan to separate Phirki from Niladri. One day, Niladri proposes to Phirki for marriage, but she refuses, saying that his parents might not accept it. Also, Bhaskar announces Niladri's marriage with Aliya. On tha day of Niladri's engagement, he goes to save Phirki from her forced marriage, and in the process, he marries her accidentally. Bhaskar reluctantly accepts Phirki, but he proposes a condition, that Phirki will never meet Lokkhi. Also Aliya gets angry upon seeing Phirki married to Niladri, and thus, she join hands with Sunanda, Ronjini and Roma to ruin Phirki and Niladri's relationship. Also, Nandini and Madhuja bonds with Phirki.

One day, Aliya commits suicide and Phirki and Niladri saves her and brings her home, as per her plan to ruin Phirki's image. She plans to make Phirki drink alcohol on Bhaskar's birthday, arranged by Phirki, to ruin her image. But to her surprise, Ronjini drinks alcohol and starts misbehaving with Phirki and Lokkhi. Bhaskar starts realising his mistake and thus, decides to throw Ronjini out of house.

On the other hand, Sudipa is shocked to meet Lokkhi, since she was the one who rescued her daughter on that day. But Moloy prevents her and accuses her of meeting his daughter's enemies. Sudipa tries to convince Moloy that Phirki is her daughter, but he refuses to believe. Meanwhile, Rudro starts hiding drugs inside Lokkhi's house. One day, at Dusshera, Rudro gets murdered by Vicky, another drug dealer, who was also Madhuja's stalker. Also on the other hand, Ronjini tries to kill Phirki, but realises her mistake after she rescues her son, and applogises to her. Lokkhi arrives at the drug factory to find Rudro lying dead. But however, the police suspects her of murdering him and drug dealing and thus arrests her. Bhaskar, agitated at Lokkhi's act, decides to sentence Lokkhi to death, but Phirki and Niladri tries to prove her innocence, but Bhaskar tries to prevent them from doing so.

Sudipa meets Lokkhi in the jail, and she reveals that she is Phirki's real mother. She narrates her story, that Phirki is her and Suman's (Sudipa's first husband) daughter. But one day, Moloy conspired to separate them, as he had an interest on her. Also he instigated the villagers to kill baby Phirki. And later, he blackmailed her to marry him, in order to save her ailing father. Also, on the other hand, Phirki finds an anklet of Rosy and suspects her of murder, but it fails. However, one day at court, Muskaan, another transgender and Bhaskar's first child, gives statement in favour of Lokkhi and thus, proves her innocence. Later, Lokkhi contests for elections and reveals that Rudro was the real drug dealer and Bhaskar knew it, which shocks Niladri and Phirki. At a picnic, Phirki learns about her mother, and thus, reconciles with Sudipa, and assures that she will find her father. Bhaskar, decides to reform his ways, and decides to bring her first child Muskaan, back. But however, the show ends with Muskaan killing Bhaskar, at the end.

Cast

Main 
 Sampriti Poddar as Phirki Sinha Roy, Niladri's love-interest and wife, Lakhsmi's adoptive daughter and Sudipa's daughter. She is a lawyer by profession.
 Adrija Mukherjee as Teenage Phirki
 Mahi Singh as Child Phirki 
 Shayan Mukherjee as Niladri Sinha Roy, Phirki's love-interest and husband, Bhaskar and Nandini's son
 Aishik Mukherjee as Child Niladri
 Aarja Banerjee as Lakshmi- Phirki's adoptive mother, a transgender

Recurring 
 Suzi Bhowmik as Rani, Lakhsmi's friend
 Kusum Samanta as Parvati/Pati Masi, Lakhsmi's friend
 Kaushik Chakraborty as Bhaskar Sinha Roy: a minister, Nandini's husband, Niladdri and Madhuja's father and Phirki's father-in-law 
 Mallika Majumdar as Nandini Sinha Roy: Bhaskar's wife, Niladdri and Madhuja's mother and Phirki's mother-in-law
 Saswati Guha Thakurta / Tanima Sen as Sunanda Sinha Roy, Bhaskar's mother and Niladdri's grandmother 
 Sohini Sanyal as Ranjini- Bhaskar's sister and Niladdri and Madhuja's aunt 
 Shaon Dey as Roma Chatterjee, Nandini's sister and political supporter of Bhaskar 
 Sanghita Ghosh as Madhuja Sinha Roy, Bhaskar and Nandini's daughter and Niladdri's sister 
 Shakshi Roy as Bidisha Sinha Roy, Bhaskar's sister and Niladdri and Madhuja's aunt
 Titas Sanyal / Sayantany Chatterjee as Aliya Sengupta, Moloy's daughter, Sudipa's step-daughter and Niladri's one-sided lover 
 Preksha Saha as Child Aliya
 Subhrajit Dutta as Rudro Sinha Roy: Bhaskar's brother and Tworita's husband; a drug dealer.
 Ratri Ghatak as Rosy, Lakhsmi's enemy
 Suchandra Banerjee as Twarita Sinha Roy, Rudro's wife
 Minakshi Ghosh as Sudipa Sengupta, Moloy's second wife, Aliya's stepmother and Phirki's biological mother
 Judhajit Banerjee as Moloy Sengupta- a famous industrialist, Bhaskar's friend, Aliya's father and Sudipa's second husband 
 Arindya Banerjee as Vicky Purkayastha 
 Sudipa Basu as Minakshi Debi.

References

2020 Indian television series debuts
2021 Indian television series endings
Bengali-language television programming in India
Transgender-related television shows
Zee Bangla original programming